Emenike Nwogu (born 25 August 2003) is a Nigerian footballer who plays as an midfielder for USL Championship side Atlanta United 2.

Club career 
In March 2022, Nwogu signed with USL Championship club Atlanta United 2 from the Super Sport Academy in Nigeria. He debuted for Atlanta on 9 April 2022, appearing as an 81st–minute substitute during a 4–0 loss to Detroit City FC.

References

External links
 

2003 births
Living people
Association football midfielders
Atlanta United 2 players
Expatriate soccer players in the United States
Nigerian expatriate footballers
Nigerian expatriate sportspeople in the United States
Nigerian footballers
USL Championship players